Full BASIC, sometimes known as Standard BASIC or ANSI BASIC, is an international standard defining a dialect of the BASIC programming language. It was developed by the American National Standards Institute (ANSI) X3.60 group in partnership with the European ECMA. It describes an advanced version of BASIC with many features including structured programming, matrix math, input/output for file handling, and many other options.

ANSI's BASIC standardization was a two-stage process. The first, carried out as Minimal BASIC starting in 1974, was an effort to clearly define and standardize the original Dartmouth BASIC language so it could be correctly implemented on different platforms. After its release in late 1977, attention turned to Full BASIC which would be based on the more powerful Structured BASIC being developed at Dartmouth College. The complexity of the system and the many additions promoted by members of the standards committee led to the effort bogging down and the first draft standard was not ready until 1986, four years late.

The standard was ratified on 26 June 1986 as ECMA-116 and January 1987 as ANSI X3.113-1987. It was completely ignored; the microcomputer revolution had occurred while the specification was being argued over, and by the early-1980s Microsoft BASIC running on tens of millions of home computers had already come and gone. Watching the process drag on, the Dartmouth participants left to produce True BASIC based on parts of the standard, but this saw little use. De facto standards like Microsoft's dominated the market and formed the basis for newer languages like Microsoft Visual Basic which incorporated similar concepts.

History

Minimal BASIC

The introduction of Dartmouth BASIC in 1964 combined a number of emerging concepts in the computer field, including timesharing and direct interaction with the user, known at the time as a "conversational interface". General Electric, who supplied the GE 235 mainframe computer it ran on, used a modified version of Dartmouth's system to start a service bureau which would eventually evolve into the GEnie online service. Many other companies, Tymshare and CompuServe notable among them, quickly introduced hosted BASIC services of their own, following the Dartmouth model.

In 1968, Hewlett-Packard (HP) introduced the HP 2000 series minicomputers, which offered the same features of the earlier mainframe systems in a rack-mount system that could be configured in a complete form for around $100,000. Their HP Time-Shared BASIC had a number of differences from Dartmouth, and these were soon copied by other mini vendors like Data General. One holdout was Digital Equipment Corporation (DEC), who did not introduce a BASIC of their own design until 1972. This version, BASIC-PLUS was different from either the HP or Dartmouth dialects. By the early 1970s where were three major dialects and dozens of minor variations being used in the market.

In January 1974 a new group formed under the ANSI umbrella to define a single standard BASIC. The Dartmouth team formed a core part of the group. Dartmouth was working on a greatly expanded version of BASIC known as Structured BASIC (SBASIC) which became the basis for ANSI. At the time, few other dialects supported its many new features. The group decided that a complete standard based on SBASIC would take some time to agree on, so the ANSI BASIC effort was split into two milestones. The first, Minimal BASIC, would produce a standard that included only the most basic features that would be required of any implementation. Even long-supported features from Dartmouth like matrix math would be left out. The draft standard for Minimal BASIC was released in January 1976, the final draft in July 1977, and it was ratified that December. Arthur Luehrmann, a physicist from Dartmouth College who was a proponent of BASIC and part of the ANSI group later stated:

"X3J2's first few years were spent (in hindsight, some might say 'wasted') on standardizing what amounts to the original 1964 Dartmouth Basic... Minimal Basic was more a toy than an actual language."

Full BASIC
The group then turned their attention to Full BASIC. By this time the microcomputer revolution was in full flight, and millions of machines running Microsoft BASIC or a similar BASIC were entering the market. In spite of this, none of the participants were microcomputer vendors or suppliers. Instead, the participants remained mainframe vendors like IBM, Control Data and General Electric, minicomputer vendors like Digital Equipment Corporation (DEC), Data General and Wang Laboratories, and other very large companies like 3M, American Express and Kodak.

The effort immediately ran afoul of the second-system effect as every member began to add their own list of "must have" features. Some wanted the language to continue the tradition of being aimed at educational uses running on small machines and desired a simple language with only rudimentary file support and similar features. Others were mainframe users that wanted to support loadable modular programs and other expansive programming features to compete with languages like COBOL or FORTRAN while offering better string manipulation. A third group was primarily interested in business applications, especially European users where BASIC had become a primary business language, and they demanded the system include extensive file handling and decimal math that did not suffer from rounding problems.

John G. Kemeny and Thomas E. Kurtz, the original designers of BASIC and members of the ANSI group, were critical of the process. In a 1982 article, Kurtz wrote about how even seemingly small issues had turned into major controversies. He used the example of the  statement. When arrays were first added to BASIC, they started at index 1, such that  made an array with three slots, 1, 2 and 3. In some cases, an index 0 is more natural, so  was added in later versions of the Dartmouth code so the same definition would have four slots, 0 to 3. During Minimal, there was continual debate about what the default base should be, and 0 was finally selected. Five years later, during the Full efforts, it was decided that arrays could define any lower bound using new syntax, .

Initially, the X3.60 group was targeting a summer 1982 date for the first technical review copy, which would be sent to the ANSI X3 committee in the fall. During this period the proposed standard would be sent out, and comments from the public would be accepted. The final draft would be sent back to X3 in 1983 for ratification that year. This proved rather optimistic. The first draft was not released until January 1985 and the final draft in 1986 for ratification in January 1987. During this time, the standard grew so large that it was ultimately split into a core module and five optional add-ons, which included complex file handling, real-time computing support, fixed decimal math, optional editing commands and even a platform-independent graphics module.

The result was criticized during the public comment period. One reviewer noted it had grown so large that "the resulting language rivals any current programming language in complexity" and that "conforming to the entire standard would compare with the most substantial compiler projects ever attempted". It goes on to describe, for instance, how there are no less than five different ways to describe a subroutine, three to define a string's maximum length and two ways to define an array. Referring to the issue of array bounds, it is noted that the committee agreed the adopted solution was "intolerable" and made plans to fix it "later".

There is no evidence that any of the participants actually built a conforming version after the release of the standard and any mention of ongoing effort promptly disappears. From 1987, the only mentions of the standard are that it exists and that True BASIC encompassed some of its features. Additionally, with millions of micros running some variation of MS's defacto standard by this point, the new ANSI standard was seen as the non-standard solution. Much of the original success of BASIC on the micro platforms was that it allowed programs to be typed in from printed source code, but by the mid-1980s this had been replaced by shrinkwrap applications and the need for BASIC as a distribution system had faded. On the large-systems side, the original use as a teaching language was being increasingly replaced by Pascal, as the external problems BASIC aimed to address, like interactivity and online editing, were now available in most systems.

True BASIC
The standards process was so slow that even the author of Structured BASIC eventually gave up on it. Stephen Garland was asked to prepare a series of College Board tests for high school students, and wrote them in Pascal instead. This was somewhat controversial given that many computers in wide use, like the Commodore 64 and TRS-80 did not have a full implementation of Pascal. Luehrmann, was critical of the effort, suggesting a more general course that would be applicable to more students.

It became clear to the Dartmouth participants in the ANSI group that the effort had no hope of being completed in any reasonable time period. They left the effort and started a new company to bring their version of the language to market as True BASIC. True BASIC combined many of the features of the core standard but also made a number of changes of its own. Among the most notable was that line numbering was now optional. The language was not well received, with many reviews expressing the same concerns about feature bloat that had been raised about the Full BASIC standard. Jerry Pournelle derided it as "madness" and John Dvorak dismissed it as "sad" and "doomed to failure."

Description

Program editing
Like previous versions of BASIC, Full BASIC was designed to work in a line editor environment and thus uses line numbers to indicate individual or ranges of lines to be edited or removed. Line numbers could range from 1 to 50,000, in contrast to Minimal which was 0 through 9999. This meant that valid Minimal programs using line 0 were invalid in Full. Logical lines were at least 132 characters long. Logical lines could be extended across several physical lines using the "continuation character", the ampersand. Unfortunately, the ampersand was also selected as the string concatenation operator, which complicated the parser.

These could then be invoked using the  command.  could also include an optional  followed by a list of parameters, in which case it was expected to return a value in a variable with the same name as the program (see functions below).

Basic functionality
There were numerous minor changes to these commands. For instance, at edit time keywords can be typed in upper or lower case, or any mixture. As was the case in the past, they were normally displayed in uppercase, while a new convention was to use snake case for multi-character variable names.

Dartmouth BASIC introduced the  statement for in-line comments and this was universally supported in other dialects. Many dialects also added a short-form, most commonly using the single-quote, as seen in Microsoft BASIC. For Full, they selected the exclamation mark,  for this role, although there appears to be no reason not to use the single quote as it is not otherwise used - strings do not allow single-quote delimiters for instance. A more controversial change was that the  keyword was now required for all assignments in order to make the parsing simpler, whereas in every other dialect   was optional. This included Minimal, so any Minimal code using this short-cut was incompatible with Full.

On top of the relatively small set of 23 keywords and 11 functions from Minimal, Full added dozens of its own, for a total of 176 keywords (defining 161 separate concepts), 38 mathematical functions and 14 string functions if all extensions were included. A simple list of the keywords, laid out in three columns, fills two pages in the standards document.

Structure
The major difference between Full and Minimal was the addition of block-oriented structured programming constructs. In Minimal, and most BASIC interpreters, the program logically consisted of independent lines of code and one could start execution at any point by ing any line number. The only exception to this rule was the  loop, where all of the lines from the FOR to NEXT were logically considered to be a single block of code. Branching into or out of a FOR block would result in odd behaviour, typically implementation dependant but generally some form of "NEXT WITHOUT FOR". In the ANSI/ISO Full BASIC standard, branching into a FOR...NEXT block is not allowed.

In Full, several existing keywords were extended and others added to provide block structures.

As the action of branching into a block or out of it without  was undefined, implementations were supposed to check for such actions and disallow them. This meant one should not be able to  into a block, but checking for such code is difficult in an interpreter which normally examines the program line-by-line; checking for branches into a block from other code in the program would normally require whole-program parsing like a compiler.

On top of these changes to the block structures, Full also added keywords for defining procedures, functions and program blocks. The return value was provided by setting a variable to the same name as the function, for instance, a function named "DOIT" would contain a line like . Functions could call other functions and themselves, meaning that the language was naturally recursive. Full also retained the earlier style of one-line function definitions using the  keyword, but removed the requirement for the function name to start with "FN". For instance, .

In previous BASICs, there was no concept of scope and all variables were global. This is not adequate for the construction of large modular programs, as one section of code may have been written using common variable names like  and might change the value of that variable in other code. A key concept of structured programming is the local variable, which holds its value separate from other variables with the same name in other locations in the composite program. As BASIC did not have the concept of scope, many programs relied on their variables being global, and used them to pass information in and out of subroutines. To allow both concepts in the new language, Full BASIC added the  keyword, which when added to a function or subroutine, made any variables within in local. As BASIC programs generally placed subroutines at the end, the  keyword could be used for forward declarations.

Data types and variables
Full BASIC introduced long variable names, finally breaking free of the single letter or letter-digit names of the past. It set the new limit at 31 characters. One minor downside to this change was that keywords had to have spaces between them, whereas most earlier versions allowed the spaces to be left out. This was because with single-letter names a line like  can be parsed as "FORS", which can not possibly be a variable in a two-letter variety of BASIC. In Full, this would have to be typed  because "FORS" is a valid variable name. As was the case in earlier BASICs, data types in Full were denoted by suffixes on the variable name. Minimal had avoided this issue by only having numeric variables, but Full included strings as well, denoted using the dollar-sign, for instance .

Full BASIC required decimal math for the default implementation of the floating point system. This is in addition to the fixed-point math option, if installed. Numeric and string variables otherwise worked like those in other BASICs.

A new addition was the fixed-point math extension, which allowed variables to have specified accuracy. This was turned on using the command  followed by an asterisk and a format specifier, for instance,  would set all numeric variables to have 8 digits of accuracy and two decimal places. Such a declaration must be placed before any mathematics code in the rest of the program. Furthermore, any single variable could be individually defined using something like .

Most BASICs supported the construction of array variables using the  keyword, for instance,  defines two arrays, the single-dimension A and two-dimension (matrix) B. In Full BASIC, the lower bound of any array was normally 1, so in this case, the variable A has five "slots", numbered 1 though 5. Full also added a new system to directly specify the lower and upper bounds using the  keyword, for instance,  which makes a one-dimensional 101-slot array.

Mathematics, logic and matrices
The new  function returns the remainder of an integer division.

The new  function returned the angle between the origin and a given X,Y point. BASIC normally calculated angles in radians, but  would convert all parameters and outputs to degrees, and the system exposed the  function which was used in these conversions and elsewhere.

Dartmouth BASIC had introduced matrix operations relatively early in its evolution, and these were part of Full. These overload the existing math functions, so one can multiply two arrays using  or multiply the contents of an array by a scalar if the B parameter is not an array. The system also adds several array-only functions, which includes o, ert and erminate, among others.

Strings
Early versions of Dartmouth BASIC did not include string variables or manipulation, the only strings in a program were constants like . Version 4, of 1968, added string variables and a single method to manipulate them, which converted strings to and from an array containing the ASCII values of the characters. For instance,  would produce an array of values in A, where A(0) was 72, the decimal ASCII value for "H". This made string manipulation fairly difficult, for instance, to extract the "HELLO" from "HELLO, WORLD!", one would have to:

10 A$="HELLO, WORLD!"
20 DIM A(25), B(5)
30 CHANGE A$ TO A
40 FOR I=1 TO 5
50 B(I)=A(I)
60 NEXT I
70 CHANGE B TO B$

Many dialects of BASIC had added their own methods of performing more useful string manipulation to avoid such complication. For Full BASIC, the committee selected a variation on the concept introduced by HP, "string slicing". This concept treats the string as an array of characters and can access them using an array-like specification known as a "slice". To extract "HELLO" from "HELLO, WORLD" in Full, one would use . One significant difference between Full's approach and previous ones like HP is that it used a different syntax for the slicing, whereas the earlier systems used array syntax. As this is the same syntax as array accesses, HP (and similar) generally did not allow string arrays, whereas this was allowed in Full.

This was the solution picked up by Microsoft when they wrote their BASIC on the PDP-10.

Input/Output
Another area of focus for Full BASIC was input/output (I/O).

 now included an optional , followed by a string, a colon and then the input variables, for instance . By this time almost all BASICs included a similar feature without the word  and using the existing print separator semicolon instead of colon, for instance in MS BASIC the same line would be . On top of this, Full also added the new  and  keywords: , which will continue execution after 30 seconds even if the user enters nothing, and will put the time it took, possibly the 30 seconds, into the variable T. For systems lacking a clock (which was not uncommon at the time), T would always return -1.

ing was similarly expanded with the optional  statement, which had already appeared on a number of implementations. The  was normally followed by a format string using number signs, asterisks and percent signs to mark decimal places. The format string could be placed in a string variable and then referred to, or an optional separate line containing a  could be referred to by line number. The current values of these various settings (and others) could be returned using . For instance,  followed by  would set J to 30.

The list of options and their interactions and limitations covers many pages in the standard.

Exception handling and debugging
Like many BASICs of the era, Full added the  command which would print out line numbers as the program executed. It could also redirect the printing of the line numbers to another device or file using , where #3 was a previously opened channel. Debugging status was limited to a particular program, so it could be turned on in one program and off in a subprogram, for instance.

Additionally, Full added true exception handlers, based on the  block. It can also be used by defining a separate subroutine-like block using  which would then be called by name using .

Graphics
Around the same time that Full was being designed, a parallel effort was underway to define the Graphics Kernel System, or GKS. This was offered as one of the optional modules in Full. For instance, the   command turned on clipping to the current viewport such that items drawn outside its boundaries would not be visible; this took a string value instead of a boolean, .

The difference is that the output of a picture block can be modified with the modification using .

Real-time
Full's real-time module added the concept of "parallel sections", through the  keyword. These looked like subroutines (and pictures) but had a number of additional keywords that controlled their invocation. The messages could invoke multiple handlers using the  ports concept.

The system also allowed these blocks and objects to be connected to external code that would create these messages. One could, for instance, have code that waited on a device that periodically created text output, and then the appropriate handler would automatically be called when new text was available. Because the actual data from such devices tends to be multi-part, not something simple like a string or number, the real-time library also added the ability to define s that could then be read or written as an atomic unit.

Although many real-time programs can be modelled as a system simply responding to external events, it is also common for the program itself to periodically post these events.

ECMA vs. ANSI
The standard was so complex and difficult to implement that the ECMA split it in two: ECMA BASIC-1 and ECMA BASIC-2. BASIC-1 included some of the file manipulation system but lacked the exception handling, while BASIC-2 added the full suite of file commands, fixed decimal math and the exception handling system. Additionally, in BASIC-1 all fundamental keywords like  were reserved words which simplified the parser, while in BASIC-2 they followed the ANSI pattern and could be used within user-created subroutines and functions.

Notes

References

Citations

Bibliography

Further reading

External links
 Decimal BASIC - a relatively complete implementation of Full BASIC and its graphics modules

BASIC programming language
American National Standards Institute standards
Ecma standards